Jee Minhyung (born 5 January 1987) is an Australian table tennis player. She competed at the 2022 Commonwealth Games, in Women's doubles, winning a silver medal.

She won the  Australian National Championship women’s singles, in 2018 and 2019.

References

External links 

 Jee Minhyung International Table Tennis Federation

1987 births
Living people
Commonwealth Games silver medallists for Australia
Australian table tennis players
Commonwealth Games medallists in table tennis
Table tennis players at the 2022 Commonwealth Games
Medallists at the 2022 Commonwealth Games